Leucaena cuspidata is a species of flowering plant in the family Fabaceae. It is found only in Mexico. It is threatened by habitat loss.

References

cuspidata
Endemic flora of Mexico
Taxonomy articles created by Polbot